Donato Giuliani (born 4 October 1946) is an Italian former professional racing cyclist. He rode in the 1975 Tour de France and 1976 Tour de France.

References

External links
 

1946 births
Living people
Italian male cyclists
Cyclists from Abruzzo
Sportspeople from the Province of Pescara
Tour de Suisse stage winners
People from Spoltore